Nikolai Bogomolov (born May 30, 1991) is a Russian professional ice hockey defenceman currently playing for PSK Sakhalin of Asia League Ice Hockey.

Bogomolov his professional debut with HC Vityaz Podolsk of the Kontinental Hockey League (KHL) during the 2009–10 season and went on to play 27 games for the team from 2009 to 2013.

References

External links

1991 births
Living people
Dizel Penza players
HC Khimik Voskresensk players
HC Kuban players
Russian ice hockey defencemen
PSK Sakhalin players
Ice hockey people from Moscow
HC Vityaz players